Howard Wayne Goss (November 1, 1934 – July 31, 1996) was an American professional baseball player who appeared in two seasons (–) in the Major Leagues as an outfielder for the Pittsburgh Pirates and Houston Colt .45s (later the Houston Astros).

He spent nine years in minor league baseball, hitting 172 home runs, before making his first Major League team, the 1962 Pirates. He was mostly a late-inning replacement that season for regular leftfielder Bob Skinner, a left-handed batter, although Goss did start 15 games in right field, normally the domain of Hall of Famer Roberto Clemente. He showed some power potential with a .351 slugging average playing in cavernous Forbes Field.

In the closing days of spring training in 1963, Goss was traded to the Colt .45s for a then-unknown 25-year-old outfielder, Manny Mota. While Goss would be Houston's regular 1963 centerfielder, he batted only .209 in 411 at bats and finished his professional career in the minor leagues in 1964. Mota went on to play 19 more seasons in the National League, and became particularly well known for his pinch hitting, at one time holding the Major League record for pinch hits.

Howie Goss appeared in 222 Major League games, with 522 at bats. His 113 hits including 24 doubles and 11 home runs. He died at age 61 in Reno, Nevada.

Sources
MLB Player Statistics Howie Goss

1934 births
1996 deaths
Arkansas Travelers players
Baseball players from Oklahoma
Columbus/Gastonia Pirates players
Houston Colt .45s players
Lincoln Chiefs players
Major League Baseball center fielders
New Orleans Pelicans (baseball) players
Oklahoma City 89ers players
People from Wewoka, Oklahoma
Phoenix Stars players
Pittsburgh Pirates players
Salinas Packers players
Salt Lake City Bees players
Vancouver Mounties players
Visalia Stars players
Waco Pirates players